Edmund Goulding (20 March 1891 – 24 December 1959) was a British screenwriter and film director. As an actor early in his career he was one of the 'Ghosts' in the 1922 silent film Three Live Ghosts alongside Norman Kerry and Cyril Chadwick. Also in the early 1920s he wrote several screenplays for star Mae Murray for films directed by her then husband Robert Z. Leonard. Goulding is best remembered for directing cultured dramas such as Love (1927), Grand Hotel (1932) with Greta Garbo and Joan Crawford, Dark Victory (1939) with Bette Davis, The Constant Nymph (1943) with Joan Fontaine, and The Razor's Edge (1946) with Gene Tierney and Tyrone Power. He also directed the classic film noir Nightmare Alley (1947) with Tyrone Power and Joan Blondell, and the action drama The Dawn Patrol.  He was also a successful songwriter, composer, and producer.

Biography 
Before moving to films, Goulding was an actor, playwright and director on the London stage.

Interviewed about his Goulding biography Edmund Goulding's Dark Victory (2009), film historian Matthew Kennedy stated:
He not only directed many types of films, but he took on multiple functions on each set. Though he didn't usually take credit, he co-wrote many scripts, composed incidental music, produced, even consulted on makeup, costumes, and hair styling. His one blind spot in production seems to be the camera...When shooting a scene, Eddie was intent on capturing performers at their best and most truthful, but he left the mechanics of filming to his cameramen...he seemed adept at just about everything — comedy (Everybody Does It, We're Not Married!), ensemble dramas (Grand Hotel), family relations (White Banners, Claudia), war (The Dawn Patrol, We Are Not Alone), psychiatry (The Flame Within), show business (Blondie of the Follies), male-female relationships (The Devil's Holiday, Riptide), and even existentialism (The Razor's Edge) and the dark arts of spiritism (Nightmare Alley).

Together with Jack Conway, Goulding holds the distinction of having directed the most Best Picture-nominated films without ever receiving a nomination for Best Director, with three (Grand Hotel, which won the award; Dark Victory; and The Razor's Edge).

Goulding died during heart surgery at Cedars of Lebanon Hospital in Los Angeles, California. He was buried at the Forest Lawn Memorial Park in Glendale, California.

Filmography

References

External links 

 
 
 
 Goulding biography

1891 births
1959 deaths
English film directors
English male screenwriters
LGBT film directors
English gay actors
English film producers
Burials at Forest Lawn Memorial Park (Glendale)
20th-century English screenwriters
20th-century English male writers
20th-century English businesspeople
20th-century English LGBT people
British emigrants to the United States